"Our Love Is on the Faultline" is a song written by Reece Kirk, and recorded by American country music artist Crystal Gayle.  It was released in March 1983 as the second single from the album True Love.  The song was Gayle's eleventh number one on the country chart.  The single stayed at number one for one week and spent a total of twelve weeks on the country chart.

Charts

Weekly charts

Year-end charts

References

1983 singles
1983 songs
APRA Award winners
Crystal Gayle songs
Song recordings produced by Allen Reynolds
Song recordings produced by Jimmy Bowen
Elektra Records singles